Tecia albinervella is a moth in the family Gelechiidae. It was described by Kieffer and Jörgensen in 1910. It is found in Argentina.

The wingspan is 21.5–23 mm. The forewings are ochreous-yellow with white veins. The hindwings are grey-whitish.

References

Tecia
Moths described in 1910